Oyam is a town in the Northern Region of Uganda. It is the primary municipal, administrative, and commercial centre of Oyam District.

Location
Oyam is bordered by Anyeke to the north, Loro to the east, Adiegi to the south, Aber to the southwest, and Pamwa to the northwest. The coordinates of the town are 2°14'06.0"N, 32°23'06.0"E (Latitude:2.2350; Longitude:32.3850).

Population
The 2002 national population census estimated the town population at 10,600. In 2010, the Uganda Bureau of Statistics (UBOS) estimated the population at 14,000. In 2011, UBOS estimated the mid-year population at 14,500.

Points of interest
The following points of interest lie within the town limits or close to the edges of the town:

 headquarters of Oyam District Administration
 offices of Oyam Town Council
 Oyam central market
 Kamdini-Lira Highway, immediately south of Oyam's town limits
 Tochi River'', within walking distance to the west of Oyam
Loro market

See also
Langi people
Murchison Falls National Park
List of cities and towns in Uganda

References

External links
Noise Is Order of The Day In Oyam

Populated places in Northern Region, Uganda
Cities in the Great Rift Valley
Oyam District
Lango sub-region